Rahimabad (also Romanized as Raḩīmābād) is a city and capital of Rahimabad District, in Rudsar County, Gilan Province, Iran.  At the 2006 census, its population was 6,994, in 2,042 families.

References

Populated places in Rudsar County
Cities in Gilan Province